Pasiphila suffusa is a moth in the family Geometridae. It is endemic to New Zealand.

References

Moths described in 1928
suffusa
Moths of New Zealand
Endemic fauna of New Zealand
Taxa named by George Hudson
Endemic moths of New Zealand